Accusefive is a Taiwanese band founded in 2017 in Yilan County, composed of lead vocalist and guitarist Pan Yun-an, singer Tsai Hsin-lun (Chuan Ching), and drummer Richard Lin.

Musical career 
Accusefive was founded in April 2017 by Pan, Tsai, and Lin, in Yilan County, Taiwan. Tsai and Pan both attended National Yilan Senior High School and are in a relationship. The band released its first mini-album, Son of Mist, in October 2017. They won Best New Artist at the 9th Golden Indie Music Awards. Their 2019 album, Somewhere in Time, I Love You, was nominated for Best New Artist and Best Band at the 31st Golden Melody Awards in 2020. Their 2020 Album, Easy Come, Easy Go, was nominated for Best Band at the 32nd Golden Melody Awards in 2021.

Members 
 Richard Lin, drummer
 Chuan Ching, vocalist
 Pan Yun-an, vocalist and guitarist

Discography

Singles

EP

Albums

Awards and nominations

References

External links 
 

Taiwanese rock music groups
Mandopop musical groups
Taiwanese indie rock groups
Taiwanese alternative rock groups
Musical groups established in 2017